Khateeb-ul-Iman Maulana Syed Muzaffar Husain Rizvi Tahir Jarwali, (1932 – Dec 1987) was a Shia religious leader, social worker and one of the prominent Jarwali Syed and celebrated preacher of late 20th century (1970s and '80s), he was also one of the founder of Shia College, Lucknow.

Family
He belonged to the family of Syeds of Zaidpur, Barabanki. His great-grandfather moved to Jarwal from Zaidpur and later his grand father and father lived in Jarwal. They belonged to the taluqdar family of Syeds and gained high respect and status in the area. Tahir Jarwali's mother was from the highly respected Shia family of India (Khanwada-e-Sahb-e-Abaqaat) The family of Mir Hamid Hussain (Saheb-e-Abqatul Anwar) & Ayatullah ul Uzma Nasirul Millat. His Mother was the daughter of Nasirul Millat. So he belonged to the family of Nasirul Millat, but, like Agha Roohi, he is not a direct descendant.

Education
For education Tahir moved to Lucknow and gained his studies under the patronage of his maternal uncles Naseerul Millat and Saeedul Millat at their residence Naseer manzil in Nakhas, Lucknow. He was nurtured in a high-profile Shia religious family. He chose to be a lawyer and studied law at University of Lucknow.

Career
During the 1970s and 1980s he organized an important annual three-day national gathering at dargah-e-shaheed-e-salis, Agra, the gathering consisted of one majlis after another from early morning to midnight. He also preached in Hyderabad, India up to late 1980s.

He was founding member of the governing board of prestigious Shia College, Lucknow.

He authored following books,
 Majalis - Mawaddat-e-Ahle Bait(a.s.), in Urdu
 Majalis - Najat, in Urdu

Sons
His sons include Shozab Jarwali, Misam Jarwali, Syed Ammar Rizvi and Abis"jarwali"

References

20th-century Muslim scholars of Islam
Scholars from Lucknow
Abaqati family
People from Bahraich